A list of films produced in Hong Kong in 2006:

2006

External links
 IMDB list of Hong Kong films
 Hong Kong films of 2006 at HKcinemamagic.com
 Hong Kong Filmography (1913-2006) at Hong Kong Film Archive

2006
Films
Hong Kong